Stan Ryan (5 December 1902 – 1 December 1983) was an Australian rules footballer who played with Richmond in the Victorian Football League (VFL).

Football
Ryan was a Tasmanian and won the best and fairest award at North Hobart in 1928. The following year he played for Richmond, making 14 appearances, including the 1929 VFL Grand Final. He played his football as a follower.

Military service
Ryan later served in the Australian Army for two years during World War II.

Notes

References
 Hogan P: The Tigers Of Old, Richmond FC, (Melbourne), 1996. 
 

1902 births
1983 deaths
Australian rules footballers from Tasmania
Australian Rules footballers: place kick exponents
North Hobart Football Club players
Richmond Football Club players